Kenneth L. Hardison (born 23 December 1956) is an American lawyer, author and a member of several law associations. He is also the founder of Carolina Mediation Services, Inc.

Career
He started his career as a business manager of the Campbell Law Review and was subsequently admitted to the North Carolina District Court, North Carolina Superior Court, North Carolina Court of Appeals, and the Eastern District of North Carolina Federal Court. He also became a Certified Mediator and is the owner of Carolina Mediation Services, Inc.

Hardison is known to have fought for people's rights as a personal injury lawyer for over 35 years based on which he founded the firm Hardison & Cochran and a Social Security disability firm, Carolina Disability Lawyers, in Myrtle Beach, South Carolina. Now, as owner and publisher of the law firm management website, Law Practice Advisor, and founder and president of PILMMA, the Personal Injury Lawyers Marketing & Management Association, Ken is focused on helping personal injury attorneys build their own preeminent law practices.

Publications
Hardison has authored and co-authored the following books:
 Systematic Marketing: How To Grow Your Firm Without Losing Your Mind, July 2015.
 Under Promise Over Deliver: How To Build The Preeminent Law Firm In Your Market, May 2015.
 Marketing for Lawyers: 8 Profit Accelerators You Must Implement In Your Firm Immediately, 2014.
 Stand Apart – Stand Out Strategies from Today's Leading Entrepreneurs and Professionals to Help You Achieve Health, Wealth & Success, 2013.
 Why Lawyers Fail to Convert New Callers Into New Clients (And What to Do About It!), 2013.
 Social Security Disability: Ultimate Guide to Winning Your Social Security Claim, 2013.
 Protect and Defend, 2012.
 Power Principles for Success, 2010.
 How To Build Your Law Practice with a Book, 2010.
 How to Effectively Market Your Personal Injury Law Practice in the 21st Century, 2009, 2nd Edition 2014.
 Worker's Compensation: "You take (45%) of My Breath Away", Campbell Law Review, Volume 4, page 107, 1982.

References

1956 births
Living people
American lawyers
People from Dunn, North Carolina
Campbell University alumni
American male writers